Pronouns in Cantonese are less numerous than their Indo-European languages counterparts. Cantonese uses pronouns that apply the same meaning to function as both subjective (English: I, he, we) and objective (me, him, us) just like many other Sinitic languages.

Personal pronouns 

* Personal pronouns are the only items in Cantonese with distinct plural forms. The character to indicate plurality is formed by adding the suffix 哋 (dei6), and classic 等 (dang2).

However, they are not used in colloquial speech.

Third person singular (keoi5) 
  Although (keoi5) is primarily used to refer to animate nouns (people or animals)in higher registers, it can also refer to inanimate objects and abstract entities in some restricted contexts. When (keoi5) is being referred to an inanimate item it is primarily found in the object position, rather than the subject position. In colloquial speech, its use is frequently extended to refer to nothing at all.

  Plural suffix (-dei6) One of the few grammatical suffixes in the language, the suffix (-dei6) cannot be used to form plural forms of nouns.

    Example: (sin1saang1-dei6) can't be used to mean teachers

Other than the personal pronouns as shown above, its two other uses are:

1. In the form (jan4-dei6) which is used for indefinite pronouns (people, one, etc.)

In this usage, the word (jan4) 'person' can also take (dei6) to mean 'people'. Despite the suffix (-dei6), (jan4-dei6) may have a singular or plural reference depending on the content.

This form can also be used to refer indirectly to oneself:

    Example: A: Nei5 dim2 gaai2 m4 ceot1 seng1 gaa3?   Why don’t you say anything?
             B: Jan4 dei6 m4 hou2 ji3 si1 aa1 maa3     It's because I’m embarrassed.

2. In contracted forms with names
    Example: Paul keoi5 dei6 → Paul-dei6         Paul and his family/friends
             A-Chan keoi5 dei6→ A-Chan-dei6      Chan and his family/company, etc.

Possessive pronoun 
To indicate possession  (ge3) is appended to the pronoun.

In literary style,  (kei4) is sometimes used for "his" or "her"; e.g.,  (kei4 fu6) means "his father" or "her father".

Omitted pronoun 
In literature, daily phrases (especially ones about family or concepts very close to the owner, or when the subject or object of the sentence is already known, then  it may be omitted, e.g.  (ngo5 lou5 mou5) or replace possession indicator with classifier, e.g.  (ngo5 gaa3 ce1).

Subject and object pronouns may be omitted in Cantonese under either of these two conditions:

 The omitted subject or object has been the topic of a previous sentence, question or dialogue.
 The reference is clear from the context. This applies especially to the first and second person subjects, and to third person entities which are present at the time of speaking.

Reflexive pronoun 
The singular personal pronouns (for humans) may be made reflexive by appending  (zi6 gei2), "self".  The reflexive form (zi6 gei2) is used for all persons: myself, yourself, herself, ourselves, etc.  It may be distinguished into two different functions:

 The true reflexive pronoun
 An emphatic function, where it reinforces a pronoun or noun phrase.

 As a reflexive, (zi gei) is subject-oriented. Another common function is to indicate 'by oneself' or 'alone'.

Pronouns in imperial times and self-deprecatory 
In imperial times, the pronoun for "I" was commonly omitted when speaking politely or to someone with higher social status. "I" was usually replaced with special pronouns to address specific situations. Examples include  gwaa jan during early Chinese history and  zam after the Qin dynasty when the Emperor is speaking to his subjects. It is extremely impolite and taboo to address the Emperor as "you" or to address oneself as "I".

In modern times, the practice of self-deprecatory terms is still used. In formal letters, the term  (gwai; lit. important) is used for "you" and "your"; e.g.,  refers to "your company".  (bun jan; lit. this person) is used to refer to oneself.

Demonstrative pronouns
 
Single proximal demonstrative refers to as "this," single distal as "that," plural proximal as "these," and plural distal as "those."

呢 (ni) and 嗰 (go) indicates if the demonstratives are proximal or distal, respectively; whereas 個 (go) and 啲 (di) indicates if the demonstratives are single or plural, respectively.

爾 (ji) and 箇 (go) are the classical forms of 呢 and 嗰, respectively. 尐 (di) and 之 (zi) are the classical forms of 啲.

Interrogative pronouns

See also 
 Cantonese grammar
 Chinese pronouns

References

Pronouns by language
Pronouns